In enzymology, a retinal oxidase is an enzyme that catalyzes the chemical reaction

retinal + O2 + H2O  retinoic acid + H2O2

The 3 substrates of this enzyme are retinal, O2, and H2O, whereas its two products are retinoic acid and H2O2.

This enzyme belongs to the family of oxidoreductases, specifically those acting on the aldehyde or oxo group of donor with oxygen as acceptor.  The systematic name of this enzyme class is retinal:oxygen oxidoreductase. This enzyme is also called retinene oxidase.  This enzyme participates in retinol metabolism.

References

 
 

EC 1.2.3
Enzymes of unknown structure